Told is a village in Hajdú-Bihar county in the Northern Great Plain region of eastern Hungary.

Geography

References

Populated places in Hajdú-Bihar County